Faires is a surname. Notable people with the surname include:

Barbara Trader Faires (born 1943), British mathematics professor
Daniel Grady Faires (born 1983), American contractor, interior designer, and craftsman
Jay Faires, American entrepreneur and investor

See also
 Fairs (surname)